Assembly Rowdy is a 1991 Indian Telugu-language action romantic drama film directed by B. Gopal and produced by Mohan Babu. He stars in the lead role along with Divya Bharti. Revolving around a slacker named Shivaji, the film shows his transformation from being a victim of unemployment to the representative of the people subjected to a corrupt political system. Upon release, it became a commercial success.

Plot
Shivaji(Mohan Babu) is a slacker who wastes time and loses every job he applies for. This outrages his father Jagayya, a newly transferred science teacher of his village. One day when Shivaji witnesses a murder and sees his mother Annapoorna having a head injury because of the goons, he takes legal action until he is framed for another murder. His parents beg the villagers to tell the truth in court as they are all witnesses, however the don who rules the village forces them to lie. Thus, Shivaji is sent to jail. His parents however manage him to get into politics and make him the MLA. Shivaji successfully becomes the new MLA, but this angers his opponent Mohan Raj, also revealed to be the don's boss. Shivaji later on arrests the don after he attacks his family. He also ends all of the don's schemes. Mohan Raj angered, kills his parents. Shivaji resigns as the MLA due to their tragic death, but still sees the end of the villains by killing them. Although, he is stabbed during the process, the film ends with Shivaji surviving and promising to protect everyone in the village as the MLA.

Cast
 Mohan Babu as Shivaji
 Divya Bharati as Jyothi/Pooja
 Jaggayya as Shivaji's father
 Gollapudi Maruti Rao as Pooja's father
 Annapoorna as Shivaji's mother
 Brahmanandam as Shivaji's maternal uncle
 Kaikala Satyanarayana
 Prasad Babu as Police Inspector
 Mohan Raj
 Mada Venkateswara Rao as D.E.O
 Vasugi as Paakija
Raju Sundaram Special Appearance in "Turpu Kondallo" song.

Soundtrack

References

External links
 

1991 films
Telugu remakes of Tamil films
Films scored by K. V. Mahadevan
Films directed by B. Gopal
1990s masala films
1990s Telugu-language films